Etesiolaus is a genus of butterflies in the family Lycaenidae. The species of this genus are found in the Afrotropical realm.

Taxonomy
The genus was previously treated as a subgenus of Iolaus, but was raised to genus level by Collins et al. in 2003.

Species
Etesiolaus catori (Bethune-Baker, 1904)
Etesiolaus kyabobo (Larsen, 1996)
Etesiolaus pinheyi Kielland, 1986

References

External links
"Etesiolaus Stempffer & Bennett, 1959" at Markku Savela's Lepidoptera and Some Other Life Forms

Iolaini
Lycaenidae genera